The 1861 Birthday Honours were appointments by Queen Victoria to various orders and honours to reward and highlight good works by citizens of the British Empire. The appointments were made to celebrate the official birthday of the Queen, and were published in The London Gazette on 28 June 1861.

The recipients of honours are displayed here as they were styled before their new honour, and arranged by honour, with classes (Knight, Knight Grand Cross, etc.) and then divisions (Military, Civil, etc.) as appropriate.

United Kingdom and British Empire

Baron
The Right Honourable Sir Richard Bethell  Chancellor of Great Britain, by the name, style, and title of Baron Westbury, of Westbury, in the county of Wilts

The Most Honourable Order of the Bath

Knight Grand Cross of the Order of the Bath (KGCB)

Military Division
Royal Navy
Vice-Admiral the Right Honourable Sir Maurice Frederick Fitzhardinge Berkeley 

Army 
General Sir Arthur Benjamin Clifton 
Admiral Sir Phipps Hornby 
General Sir James Archibald Hope 
General Sir Thomas William Brotherton 
General Sir Samuel Benjamin Auchmuty 
Admiral Sir Barrington Reynolds 
General Thomas Willshire 
Lieutenant-General Sir Harry David Jones

Knight Commander of the Order of the Bath (KCB)

Military Division
Royal Navy
Admiral Edward Harvey 
Vice-Admiral Henry William Bruce
Vice-Admiral William Fanshawe Martin
Rear-Admiral Lewis Tobias Jones 

Army
Lieutenant-General William Henry Sewell 
Lieutenant-General George William Paty 
Lieutenant-General James Shaw Kennedy 
Lieutenant-General George Leigh Goldie 
Lieutenant-General John Michell 
Major-General William Brereton 
Colonel the Earl of Longford

References

Birthday Honours
1861 awards
1861 in the United Kingdom